Sclerogryllus is an Asian genus of crickets, typical of the subfamily Sclerogryllinae and the only genus in the tribe Sclerogryllini.

Species
The Orthoptera Species File lists:
 Sclerogryllus coriaceus (Haan, 1844) – type species (as Gryllus coriaceus Haan)
 Sclerogryllus matsuurai (Oshiro, 1988)
 Sclerogryllus punctatus (Brunner von Wattenwyl, 1893)
 Sclerogryllus tympanalis Yin & Liu, 1996
 Sclerogryllus variolosus (Chopard, 1933)

References

External links
 
 Images on GBIF: Sclerogryllus Gorochov, 1985

Ensifera genera
crickets
Orthoptera of Asia